Jón Rói Jacobsen (born 7 April 1983) is a former Faroese football defender.

Club career
Once hailed as Faroese most promising football talent, Jacobsen started his career as a striker for HB Torshavn, scoring 12 goals in the 2002 league season to end up 3rd in that seasons' goalscorers chart. His versatility gave him the chance to play in the Danish league, where he played for Brøndby IF and BK Frem before signing up for AaB Aalborg in 2006. He moved back to BK Frem in July 2008 with the hope to have more playing chances.

International career
Jacobsen made his debut for the Faroese national team in a June 2001 World Cup qualifying match against Switzerland, coming on as a substitute for Uni Arge. He collected 36 caps in total. In 2008, 25-year-old Jacobsen retired from professional football, to fully concentrate on his medical studies in Copenhagen.

Honours
Individual
Boldklubben Frem Player of the Year (1) : 2005

References

External links
 
 Aalborg BK profile 
 Career stats at Danmarks Radio
 Boldklubben Frem profile 
 Brøndby IF profile 

1983 births
Living people
Faroese footballers
Faroe Islands international footballers
Brøndby IF players
Boldklubben Frem players
AaB Fodbold players
Danish Superliga players
Association football defenders
Havnar Bóltfelag players
Faroe Islands youth international footballers